Catharine Ann Fish Stebbins was a signatory of the Declaration of Sentiments at the Seneca Falls Convention in 1848 at the age of 24. She was born on August 17, 1823, and died on November 8, 1904, at 81. She was an activist and educator from Rochester, New York.

References

1823 births
1904 deaths
19th-century American people